The 2018 Slovakia v Denmark football match was an international friendly association football match between the senior national teams of Slovakia and Denmark. The match took place on 5 September 2018 at the Anton Malatinský Stadium in Trnava, Slovakia. Due to a dispute with the Danish players' union regarding commercial rights, the Danish Football Union replaced the regular national squad, which had not lost a match in nearly two years, with an entirely uncapped squad consisting of semi-professional and amateur players from the third, fourth and fifth tiers of the Danish football league system, as well as futsal players. Despite the vast inexperience of the Danish players, and having only been called up 48 hours prior, the match only finished as a 3–0 win for Slovakia. The Danish team were praised for their performance in avoiding humiliation, especially futsal goalkeeper Christoffer Haagh, who made seven saves during the match.

Background
The fixture was the first match for Denmark since the 2018 FIFA World Cup in Russia, where they were eliminated in the round of 16 by Croatia in a penalty shoot-out following a 1–1 draw after extra time. As the match is counted as a draw for statistical purposes, Denmark were undefeated in official matches since 11 October 2016, when they lost to Montenegro in World Cup qualifying. The Danish team were tied for 9th in the FIFA World Rankings prior to the match, while Slovakia were ranked 26th. The match was the third meeting between Slovakia and Denmark.

Following the World Cup, the national team agreement between the Danish players' union (Spillerforeningen) and the Danish Football Union (DBU) had expired on 31 July 2018, and a new one was undergoing negotiations since the start of the year. On 20 August 2018, Denmark national team manager Åge Hareide named a squad of 21 players for their friendly match against Slovakia and opening UEFA Nations League match against Wales, taking place on 5 and 9 September 2018 respectively. The squad, which later had two more players added on 28 August, largely featured regulars of the national team. However, negotiations between the players' union and the DBU for a new national team agreement had stalled, largely over issues related to the commercial image rights of the players. The dispute arose as Hummel had the exclusive right to the manufacture and marketing of Danish kits. The DBU wanted to use individual players, without explicit permissions, in their advertising. After failing to meet the last deadline of 31 August 2018, the negotiations were suspended at the start of September. The DBU offered to extend the previous agreement for the September 2018 matches, thus allowing for the negotiations to be completed after the international window. The DBU wanted to avoid fines and possible exclusion by UEFA for failing to play their two scheduled September 2018 matches. The DBU were under a four-year probationary period with UEFA for having forfeited a Women's World Cup qualifying match against Sweden in 2017 due to a similar dispute with the women's team, and a further violation could have resulted in Denmark being prohibited from participation in either the Nations League or the UEFA Euro 2020. After no extension agreement could be reached by the evening of 2 September, the Danish Football Union confirmed on 3 September that a new squad and manager would be announced for the upcoming national team matches.

On 4 September, the DBU announced an entirely uncapped squad to play in the friendly against Slovakia in lieu of the regular side. The DBU had decided to wait in announcing the team until the plane had left Danish soil, and airport staff had blocked to the view of the plane using two fire engines to prevent photographs being taken by the press. The search for a replacement squad was complicated by the fact that many of the players in Denmark's first and second divisions were also members of the players' union. Several players from the first division had expressed interest in playing for the team, though all later withdrew their statement due to fears over the pressure of potential harassment they would be subjected to. The replacement team consisted of a mixture of futsal players from the Denmark national team, and semi-professional and amateur players from the third, fourth and fifth tiers of Danish football league system. The team was assembled only 48 hours prior to the match. It was feared that the same squad would be used for the competitive Nations League fixture against Wales four days later. National team coach Hareide would similarly not be involved, with the side instead falling under the temporary management of John Jensen, a member of Denmark's UEFA Euro 1992 winning squad, with  serving as the assistant manager. Jensen had not met any of the players prior to travelling for the away match. In a news conference, Jensen said, "I had to start from scratch and ask each player his name and which position he plays on the field."

Expectations for Denmark were low due to the team's inexperience and lack of preparation, and because of Slovakia's full-strength side. Due to the weakened Danish selection, the entrance fee for the match were reduced to €1, and those who bought tickets in advance received a refund. The Slovak Football Association urged UEFA to review the situation and take appropriate action. Slovakia manager Ján Kozák was frustrated by Denmark's team selection, and said they would not have scheduled the fixture had they known in advance.

Slovakia captain Martin Škrtel was also disappointed in the opposition.

Squads
The age listed for each player is on 5 September 2018, the day of the match. The numbers of caps and goals listed for each player are those prior to the match.

Slovakia
Slovakia called up 24 players for the friendly match, as well as their opening UEFA Nations League match against Ukraine on 9 September 2018.

Manager: Ján Kozák

Denmark

Original
Denmark originally called up 23 players for the friendly match, as well as their opening UEFA Nations League match against Wales on 9 September 2018.

Manager: Åge Hareide

Replacement
Denmark called up 24 players for the friendly match, replacing the originally selected squad.

Manager: John Jensen

All of the players on the team had jobs outside football, including the following:
Christian Bannis: worker at insurance company
Christian Bommelund Christensen: carpenter
Adam Fogt: political science student
Anders Fønss: warehouse worker and boat mechanic
Christoffer Haagh: administrative worker and owner of a goalkeeping company
Rasmus Johansson: internet freestyle footballer
Kevin Jørgensen: prison guard
Victor Vobbe Larsen: newspaper salesman
Christian Offenberg: part-time salesman
Kasper Skræp: secondary school student
Simon Vollesen: student

Match
Prior to the match, a moment of silence was held for the footballers Juraj Halenár and Vojtěch Varadín, both natives of Trnava, who had died in the months prior.

Summary
Adam Nemec opened the scoring for Slovakia in the 11th minute of the match with a header past goalkeeper Christoffer Haagh at the back post, following a chipped cross from Juraj Kucka on the right side. Denmark managed to create chances of their own, including two in the 25th minute after Kasper Kempel's cross was missed by Christian Offenberg and a shot from  out by Oskar Høybye went over the crossbar. Denmark held off the opposition attacks until the 37th minute, when Kucka registered his second assist of the match after laying a ball back to Albert Rusnák, who scored beneath the goalkeeper to put Slovakia up 2–0 at half-time. Denmark remained well-organised and compact, despite finishing with one shot on target and only 27% possession. The majority of the second period was played in Denmark's half, though the score remained unchanged until the 79th minute, when Danish substitute futsal player Adam Fogt scored an own goal past Haagh after failing to clear a low cross sent by Róbert Mak from the left and deflected by Michal Ďuriš. Haagh made seven saves in the match, helping prevent a worse defeat for Denmark.

Details

Statistics

Aftermath
Following the match, the Danish team were praised for the result, especially goalkeeper Christoffer Haagh for his role in preventing Slovakia from scoring more. Reuters described the defeat as a "moral victory" for the Danish team and stated "31-year-old Haagh played the game of his life". In a press conference following the match, temporary Denmark coach John Jensen called the group of players "heroes".

In interviews after the match, many Slovak players expressed their continued frustration for the friendly being inadequate preparation for their upcoming competitive fixtures.

On 6 September 2018, the day after the match, the DBU announced that the replacement players would return to their clubs, and a temporary agreement until 30 September had been reached with the players' union, thus enabling the originally selected squad, featuring the regular national team players, to play in their first Nations League fixture. On 9 September, Denmark won 2–0 at home against Wales in Aarhus with a brace from Christian Eriksen. On the same day, Slovakia lost their opening Nations League match away to Ukraine following a late penalty scored by Andriy Yarmolenko. Slovakia manager Ján Kozák would later resign the following month after over five years as coach, and the team was to be relegated from their Nations League group, but was ultimately saved from relegation by the format change of the Nations League for the upcoming edition. Denmark would go on to finish undefeated in their Nations League group, and were promoted to League A.

On 29 September 2018, the DBU and the players' union reached a new collective agreement for the men's senior national team, lasting until 2024.

References

External links
 Match report at WorldFootball.net
 Match report at Soccerway.com
 Match report at FootballDatabase.eu
 Match report at EU-Football.info
 Match report at National-Football-Teams.com
 Match report at 11v11.com
 Match report at DBU.dk

2018 in association football
International association football matches
Slovakia v Denmark
Slovakia v Denmark
Slovakia national football team matches
Denmark national football team matches
Labour disputes in Denmark
September 2018 sports events in Europe
Sport in Trnava